Jamal Wilson (born September 1, 1988 in Nassau) is a Bahamian high jumper. He competed at the 2016 Summer Olympics in the men's high jump event; his result of 2.22 meters in the qualifying round did not qualify him for the final.

His personal bests in the event are 2.30 metres outdoors (Nassau 2016) and 2.33 metres indoors (Banská Bystrica 2020).

International competitions

References

1988 births
Living people
Bahamian male high jumpers
Olympic athletes of the Bahamas
Athletes (track and field) at the 2016 Summer Olympics
Athletes (track and field) at the 2020 Summer Olympics
Sportspeople from Nassau, Bahamas
Athletes (track and field) at the 2014 Commonwealth Games
Athletes (track and field) at the 2018 Commonwealth Games
Commonwealth Games silver medallists for the Bahamas
Commonwealth Games medallists in athletics
Athletes (track and field) at the 2019 Pan American Games
Pan American Games competitors for the Bahamas
Competitors at the 2014 Central American and Caribbean Games
Competitors at the 2018 Central American and Caribbean Games
Medallists at the 2018 Commonwealth Games